Ébano F.C. is a football club that plays in the Mexican Football League Segunda División Profesional. The club is based in Ébano, San Luis Potosi, Mexico.

See also
Football in Mexico

External links
Segunda Division

Football clubs in San Luis Potosí
2007 establishments in Mexico